The Dodentocht (Dutch for March of the Dead) is a long-distance march of 100 kilometers organized annually in Bornem, Belgium, since 1970. The grueling march derives its name from the length of the march and the rough and forested terrain. At the 2016 edition, 12,608 participants had registered. A scouting group also organises a campsite for the participants; the campsite can hold 500 people that want to arrive earlier.

History
In 45 years the Dodentocht has become one of the most important hiking happenings in Europe. It began in 1970 with 65 participants and has since grown into an event with over 13,000 hikers. Marchers have come from many countries, including the United States, the United Kingdom, and Germany.

The Dodentocht is organised by the non profit organisation 100 km Dodentocht® Kadee Bornem. Approximately 600 members of the organisation are involved during the event itself. During the 2012 edition (held on 10/11 August), marchers were followed on the official site via a tracking system, utilizing small RFID tags on badges worn outside their clothing that are automatically scanned at each of the 15 checkpoints and at additional random points along the route. Many of the marchers return year after year; in 2011, Jef Kuppens finished the march for the 42nd consecutive time since the beginning of the Dodentocht, with which he was record holder at that moment.

The organizers have adopted a motto, "Walking for a better world"; many of the participants walk for charities.

Since the course is closed for non-participants, some of the churches along the route have been forced to reschedule church services; the pastor of the local federation of churches, Pastor Maervoet, participated in the march in 2009, for the fifth time.

Local companies that support the event have led to some unique features in this event. The route of the walk passes through the premises of several companies. These include, at 15 km, the factory of a popular sports drink, at 40 km, the Duvel brewery in Breendonk - with free beer for all walkers.

On August 14, 2010, a walker collapsed 300 meters short of the finish line and died from cardiac arrest. The walker had already walked the Dodentocht 5 times and was properly trained. The event was not cancelled, but the festivities celebrating the arrival of the last walkers did not take place.

Since 2018 a limit has been set on the number of participants. The number of participants became too large and the organization wanted to be able to continue to guarantee proper functioning of the event. In 2019 the 13000 places were sold in a matter of hours.

In the days leading up to the 53rd Dodentocht in August 2022, it was announced by the organisers, at the request of the Belgium government, that the event would not continue in its current format due to the ongoing heatwave at the time. In response, the length of the route was reduced by approximately a 1/3 to 63.6km to be completed by 1pm the following day. All participants who successfully completed the shortened route received the Dodentocht medal and diploma.

Prizes
There are no rankings or records. If a walker completes the route in under 24 hours then they are awarded a certificate confirming their timings, a medal, badge and a large gingerbread.

Participants

See also
International Four Days Marches Nijmegen
Kennedy march

References

External links
 
 Dodentocht: A site chronicling the participation by five Americans in 1997

Challenge walks
Walking in Belgium
Annual events in Belgium
1970 establishments in Belgium
Recurring events established in 1970
Bornem